Mihashi (written: 三橋 lit. "three bridges") is a Japanese surname. Notable people with the surname include:

, Japanese singer
, Japanese footballer
, Japanese actor

Japanese-language surnames